In mathematics, a cohomological invariant of an algebraic group G over a field is an invariant of forms of G taking values in a Galois cohomology group.

Definition
Suppose that G is an algebraic group defined over a field K, and choose a separably closed field  containing K. For a finite extension L of K in  let ΓL be the absolute Galois group of L. The first cohomology  H1(L, G) = H1(ΓL, G) is a set classifying the ``G-torsors over L, and is a functor of L. 

A cohomological invariant of G of dimension d taking values in a ΓK-module M is a natural transformation of functors (of L) from H1(L, G) to Hd(L, M).

In other words a cohomological invariant associates an element of an abelian cohomology group to elements of a non-abelian cohomology set.

More generally, if A is any functor from finitely generated extensions of a field to sets, then a cohomological invariant of A of dimension d taking values in a Γ-module M is a natural transformation of functors (of L) from A to Hd(L, M).

The cohomological invariants of a fixed group G or functor A, dimension d and Galois module M form an abelian group denoted by Invd(G,M) or Invd(A,M).

Examples

Suppose A is the functor taking a field to the isomorphism classes of dimension n etale algebras over it. The cohomological invariants with coefficients in Z/2Z is a free module over the cohomology of k with a basis of elements of degrees 0, 1, 2, ..., m where m is the integer part of n/2. 
The Hasse−Witt invariant of a quadratic form is essentially a dimension 2 cohomological invariant of the corresponding spin group taking values in a group of order 2.
If G is a quotient of a group by a smooth finite central subgroup C, then the boundary map of the corresponding exact sequence gives a dimension 2 cohomological invariant with values in C.  If G is a special orthogonal group and the cover is the spin group then the corresponding invariant is essentially the Hasse−Witt invariant.
If G is the orthogonal group of a quadratic form in characteristic not 2, then there are Stiefel–Whitney classes for each positive dimension which are cohomological invariants with values in Z/2Z. (These are not the topological Stiefel–Whitney classes of a real vector bundle, but are the analogues of them for vector bundles over a scheme.) For dimension 1 this is essentially the discriminant, and for dimension 2 it is essentially the Hasse−Witt invariant. 
The Arason invariant e3 is a dimension 3 invariant of some even dimensional quadratic forms q with trivial discriminant and trivial Hasse−Witt invariant. It takes values in Z/2Z. It can be used to construct a dimension 3 cohomological invariant of the corresponding spin group as follows. If u is in H1(K, Spin(q)) and p is the quadratic form corresponding to the image of u in H1(K, O(q)), then e3(p−q) is the value of the dimension 3 cohomological invariant on u. 
The Merkurjev−Suslin invariant is a dimension 3 invariant of a special linear group of a central simple algebra of rank n taking values in the tensor square of the group of nth roots of unity. When n=2 this is essentially the Arason invariant.
For absolutely simple simply connected groups G'', the Rost invariant is a dimension 3 invariant taking values in Q/Z(2) that in some sense generalizes the Arason invariant and the Merkurjev−Suslin invariant to more general groups.

References

 
 

Algebraic groups